The 1988 Livingston Open was a men's tennis tournament played on outdoor hard courts that was part of the 1988 Nabisco Grand Prix. It was played at Newark Academy in Livingston, New Jersey in the United States from August 15 through August 22, 1988. First-seeded Andre Agassi won the singles title.

Finals

Singles

 Andre Agassi defeated  Jeff Tarango 6–2, 6–4
 It was Agassi's 6th singles title of the year and the 7th of his career.

Doubles

 Grant Connell /  Glenn Michibata defeated  Marc Flur /  Sammy Giammalva Jr. 2–6, 6–4, 7–5
 It was Connell's only title of the year and the 1st of his career. It was Michibata's only title of the year and the 1st of his career.

References

External links
 ITF tournament edition details